Howland Chamberlin (August 2, 1911 – September 1, 1984) was an American actor. He is sometimes billed as Howard Chamberlin, sometimes replacing the word, land.

Chamberlain was born in The Bronx. He moved in the 1930s from New York to California and worked at a Federal Theatre Project, where he met his wife Leona, and at the Pasadena Playhouse. He made his film debut in the 1946 drama The Best Years of Our Lives, and the film won seven Oscars. In the next years, he often portrayed nervous figures in film noir. Although Chamberlain's appearance was uncredited, he was memorable as the cynical hotel receptionist in 1952's High Noon. High Noon remained Chamberlain's last film for 25 years, because he was blacklisted by the House of Un-American Activities and did not get any film roles.

He returned to working in New York, where he worked as a stage actor. In 1977 he made his screen comeback in the TV film A Touch of the Poet. He played Judge Atkins in the 1979 film Kramer vs. Kramer by Robert Benton. This was Chamberlain's third film in which a fellow cast member won the Oscar for Best Actor. He worked as an actor until his death.

Chamberlain's Broadway credits included Achilles Had a Heel (1935), Sly Fox (1976), and Stages (1978).

Chamberlain died in Oakland, California, on September 1, 1984.

Filmography

References

External links
 

1911 births
1984 deaths
American male film actors
20th-century American male actors
American male stage actors
Western (genre) television actors